Gaius Pius Esuvius Tetricus was the emperor of the Gallic Empire from 271 to 274 AD. During his reign, he faced external pressure from Germanic raiders, who pillaged the eastern and northern parts of his empire, and the Roman Empire, from which the Gallic Empire had seceded. He also faced increasing internal pressure, which led him to declare his son, Tetricus II,  in 273 and possibly co-emperor in 274, although this is debated. The Roman emperor Aurelian invaded in 273 or 274, leading to the Battle of Châlons, at which Tetricus surrendered. Whether this capitulation was the result of a secret agreement between Tetricus and Aurelian or necessary after his defeat is debated. Tetricus died of natural causes a few years after 274.

Background

The Gallic Empire is the historiographic name given to a state composed of the Roman provinces which made up Britannia, Hispania, and Gaul, which broke away from the Roman Empire during the reign of Emperor Gallienus. Gallienus had become emperor after his father, Emperor Valerian, was captured by the Sassanids in 260. Gallienus's rule occurred during the Crisis of the Third Century (235–284), a period of intense political and military power struggles. Gallienus was overwhelmed by numerous issues, including several usurpers, and barbarian attacks in the Balkans and along the Rhine — one attack by the Franks pushed as far as Tarraco (modern-day Tarragona) in Hispania. Because Gallienus was unable to prevent the raids, Postumus, a military commander on the Rhine frontier, rose up and declared himself emperor; at about the same time, he assassinated Saloninus, Gallenius's son and co-emperor, in Colonia (modern-day Cologne). Postumus focused on defending the Gallic Empire, and, in the words of ancient Roman historian Eutropius, "restored the almost exhausted provinces through his enormous vigour and moderation."

Gallienus attempted to invade the Gallic Empire twice but was repulsed both times, forcing him to acquiesce to the secession. Although he was unable to conquer the Gallic Empire, Gallienus did ensure that the Roman Empire was defended; he posted Aureolus, a military commander, in northern Italia, to prevent Postumus from crossing the Alps. Postumus was killed by his own soldiers in 269 in Mogontiacum (modern-day Mainz) while putting down a revolt by the usurper Laelianus, because he refused to allow them to sack the city. After the army killed Postumus, they elected Marcus Aurelius Marius, an officer, as Gallic Emperor. Victorinus declared himself emperor in mid-269 in Augusta Treverorum (modern-day Trier), two days after killing Marius. Victorinus's rule was recognized by the provinces of Britannia and Gaul, but not by those of Hispania.

Life

Gaius Pius Esuvius Tetricus, commonly referred to as Tetricus I, was born in Gaul, on an unknown date, to a noble family. In early 271, Emperor Victorinus was murdered in Colonia by Attitianus, an officer in the Gallic army, allegedly because he had seduced Attitianus's wife. Because the motivation for his assassination was personal, rather than political, Victorinus's mother, Victoria, was able to retain power within the empire; her power allowed her to appoint Tetricus as emperor after securing the support of the army through bribes. The army proclaimed Tetricus as Gallic emperor in spring of the same year at Burdigala (modern-day Bordeaux), although Tetricus was not present for the proclamation. 

The Gallic Empire mirrored the Roman imperial administrative traditions, and as such each Gallic emperor adopted a Roman regnal title upon his accession; after becoming emperor, Tetricus's name was changed to Imperator Caesar Esuvius Tetricus Pius Felix Invictus Augustus Pontifex Maximus. The Gallic Empire also followed the Roman tradition of emperors appointing themselves as consul, with Tetricus appointing himself as consul in 271, 272, 273, and 274; the names of the other consuls for 271–273 are not known, but it is known that Tetricus's son, Tetricus II, served as his colleague in 274. Tetricus was also  from 271 to 274. The unreliable , in its biography of Emperor Aurelian, states that Tetricus elevated his son at an unspecified date, however neither of the ancient historians Aurelius Victor or Eutropius mention such an event.

During Tetricus's reign, the main threats to the Gallic Empire came from the Roman Empire and Germanic tribes. Tetricus also had to contend with dissent within the army and government. Tetricus was recognized as emperor by all of Gaul — except Gallia Narbonensis, which had been partially reconquered by Placidianus, a general under Roman emperor Claudius Gothicus — and Britannia. He was not recognized by the province of Hispania, including Hispania Baetica, Lusitania, and Hispania Tarraconensis, which had earlier refused to recognize Victorinus as emperor, nor by the city of Argentoratum (modern-day Strasbourg) in Germania. The provinces that did not recognize Tetricus chose instead to recognize Roman Emperor Aurelian, who had been proclaimed emperor in September 270 at Sirmium in Pannonia. By the time of Tetricus's rule, the Germanic tribes had become increasingly aggressive, launching raids across the Rhine and along the coast. Tetricus moved the capital of the Gallic Empire from Colonia to Augusta Treverorum in late 271 in order to guard against the Germanic tribes. Tetricus attacked them with some success, mainly during the early part of his reign, even celebrating a triumph for one of his victories. Later in his reign, he was forced to withdraw troops and abandon forts, which allowed the border territories to be pillaged. Later Germanic raids were met with almost no opposition — one penetrated so far into Gallic territory that it reached the Loire. While Aurelian was focused on attacking the Palmyrene Empire, which had broken away from the Roman Empire in 270 under Empress Zenobia, Tetricus was able to recover Gallia Narbonensis and southeastern parts of Gallia Aquitania. During 273–274, Faustinus, provincial governor of Gallia Belgica, rebelled against Tetricus, however, his revolt was swiftly crushed.

After Aurelian had succeeded in his reconquest of the Palmyrene Empire, he turned his attention to the Gallic Empire, beginning preparations for an invasion in 273. In early 274, Aurelian began to march into northern Gaul, while Tetricus led his troops southward from Augusta Treverorum to meet him. The armies of Aurelian and Tetricus met in February or March 274 at the Battle of Châlons, near modern-day Châlons. The army of Tetricus was soundly defeated, and Tetricus surrendered either directly after his defeat or later; the latest possible date for his surrender was March 274, when the Gallic mints switched from minting coins of Tetricus I and II to those of Aurelian. However, this is believed by modern historians to be a product of Roman imperial propaganda; Aurelian, who was attempting to stabilise his fragile empire, benefited from the account that Tetricus had planned to betray his army, as his troops would then be less likely to rise up again.

Upon Tetricus's surrender, the Gallic Empire rejoined the Roman Empire, once more restored to its former borders, and Aurelian held a triumph in Rome involving many chariots; twenty elephants; two hundred beasts, including tigers, giraffes, and elk; eight hundred gladiators; and prisoners from various barbarian tribes. The leaders of the two secessionist states, Tetricus of the Gallic Empire and Zenobia of the Palmyrene Empire, were paraded during this triumph, along with Tetricus II; Tetricus and his son were not placed in chains for their march, but instead were made to wear  (Gallic trousers). The   states that he was made  (corrector of Lucania) in the biography of Tetricus, but states that he was made  (corrector of Italy) in the biography of Aurelian. Tetricus died of natural causes several years later in Italia.

Numismatics

The gold aurei issued during the reign of Tetricus fall into several types. Seven surviving coins feature his image on the obverse, with the reverses showing him riding a horse, a standing Aequitas, a standing Jupiter, a standing Laetitia, a standing Pax, him holding an olive branch and a scepter, or a standing Spes. One features his face on the obverse and a standing Hilaritas on the reverse. Another displays his head on the obverse and a depiction of the Roman goddess Victoria walking to the right on the reverse. There are two aureus types that depicted Tetricus I and Tetricus II together; both feature jugate images of them on the obverse, with one having a standing Aeternitas on the reverse and the other having a standing Felicitas. A rare quinarius (a silver coin) issued during his reign has a three-quarter facing image of Tetricus on the obverse and Victoria standing with her foot on a globe on the reverse. 

Most of the coins minted during Tetricus's reign were of low quality; his antoninianus contained so little silver content that imitations were easy to make, leading to the market being flooded with fakes.

The coinage of the Gallic Empire does not give any evidence of public games or festivals, as was common in the Roman Empire, although it is believed that similar games and festivals were held. There are a number of issues of coins in which the emperor's head faces left, rather than the usual right, which are believed to have been used for donatives granted to soldiers upon the emperor's accession or consulships.

Historiography
The ancient sources for the Gallic Empire are poor, made up largely of brief notes from late-fourth-century Latin authors who depended heavily on the theorised , scattered references from the first book of the ancient Roman historian Zosimus, and information taken from the coinage minted by the Gallic emperors. The  states that Tetricus was recognized in Hispania, but modern historians have rejected this.

Epigraphic sources also provide some information, however, the usage of epigraphs was in decline during the period, and many are undated.  Inscriptions bearing Tetricus' name are very common throughout Gaul, although these are broken into two regions by a vertical line of inscriptions bearing Aurelian's name, which were made after the surrender of Tetricus; no Tetrican inscriptions overlap with Aurelianic inscriptions.

Notes

References

Primary sources
These sources were written by early chroniclers and have been drawn upon by modern scholars.
 Aurelius Victor, 
 Aurelius Victor, 
 Eutropius, Book 9
 , The Thirty Tyrants
 Joannes Zonaras, Compendium of History, Zonaras: Alexander Severus to Diocletian: 222–284
 Zosimus,

Citations

Bibliography

External links

Gallic emperors
Thirty Tyrants (Roman)
Imperial Roman consuls
3rd-century Romans
3rd-century monarchs in Europe
Year of birth unknown
Year of death unknown
Monarchs taken prisoner in wartime
Gallic consuls